Óscar Cruz López (born 1 December 1957) is a Mexican politician affiliated with the Party of the Democratic Revolution. As of 2014 he served as Senator of the LIX Legislature of the Mexican Congress representing Oaxaca as replacement of Daniel López Nelio.

References

1957 births
Living people
Politicians from Oaxaca
Members of the Senate of the Republic (Mexico)
Party of the Democratic Revolution politicians
People from Juchitán de Zaragoza
National Autonomous University of Mexico alumni
Members of the Congress of Oaxaca